Lattanzi is an Italian surname. Notable people with the surname include:

 Chloe Lattanzi (born 1986), American actress and singer
 Flavia Lattanzi (born 1940), Italian lawyer and judge
 Giorgio Lattanzi (born 1939), Italian judge
 Josh Lattanzi, American musician
 Lattanzio Lattanzi (died 1587), Italian Roman Catholic prelate
 Matt Lattanzi (born 1959), American actor and dancer
 Pasquale Lattanzi (born 1950), Italian footballer
 Tina Lattanzi (1897–1997), Italian actress

Italian-language surnames